Martina Moser (born 9 April 1986) is a Swiss football midfielder, currently playing for FC Zürich in Swiss Nationalliga A.
She is a member of the Swiss national team. In both 2018 and 2019, she helped her team win the Nationalliga A Women and Schweizer Pokal Frauen trophies. In 2021, they were runners-up for both.

References

External links

 
 Profile at TSG 1899 Hoffenheim 

1986 births
Living people
Swiss women's footballers
Swiss expatriate sportspeople in Germany
Expatriate women's footballers in Germany
VfL Wolfsburg (women) players
SC Freiburg (women) players
TSG 1899 Hoffenheim (women) players
2015 FIFA Women's World Cup players
Switzerland women's international footballers
People from Burgdorf, Switzerland
Women's association football midfielders
FIFA Century Club
Swiss Women's Super League players
FC Zürich Frauen players
Sportspeople from the canton of Bern
UEFA Women's Euro 2017 players
Swiss expatriate women's footballers